Xanthocercis madagascariensis is a species of flowering plant in the family Fabaceae. It is found only in Madagascar.

References

Angylocalyceae
Trees of Madagascar
Vulnerable plants
Taxa named by Henri Ernest Baillon
Taxonomy articles created by Polbot
Plants described in 1870